The following list of dry areas by U.S. state details all of the counties / parishes / boroughs / municipalities in the United States of America that ban the sale of alcoholic beverages.

For more background information, see dry county and Prohibition in the United States. For more information on semi-wet counties, see moist county.

Overview

States that permit localities to go dry
33 states have laws that allow localities to prohibit the sale (and in some cases, consumption and possession) of liquor. Still, many of these states have no dry communities. Two states—Kansas and Tennessee—are entirely dry by default: counties specifically must authorize the sale of alcohol in order for it to be legal and subject to state liquor control laws.
Alabama specifically allows cities and counties to elect to go dry by public referendum.
Alaska specifically allows local jurisdictions to elect to go dry by public referendum.
Arkansas specifically allows local jurisdictions to elect to go dry by public referendum.
California specifically allows local jurisdictions to enact liquor laws that are stricter than state law.
Colorado specifically allows cities and counties to exercise a local option by public referendum whether to go dry.
Connecticut specifically allows towns to exercise a local option by public referendum whether to go dry.
Delaware's state constitution allows specifically defined local districts to elect to go dry by public referendum.
Florida specifically allows counties to elect to go dry by public referendum.
Georgia specifically allows any local jurisdiction to go dry, without limitation on how that decision is made.
Idaho allows local jurisdictions to prohibit sale of liquor by the drink by public referendum, but because all retail package sales are controlled by the state, no local jurisdiction may prohibit package liquor sales for consumption off-premises.
Kansas is dry by default; counties have to choose to allow liquor sales in order for liquor to be sold at all in the county. (see Alcohol laws of Kansas)
Kentucky specifically allows local jurisdictions to elect to go dry by public referendum. The Kentucky Constitution implies that the default wet/dry status of any local subdivision reflects the state of its local laws at the time that statewide prohibition ended.
Louisiana specifically allows local jurisdictions to go dry, without limitation on how that decision is made.
Maine specifically allows local jurisdictions to elect to go dry by public referendum.
Massachusetts requires that a series of questions of whether to go dry be placed on each municipality's local ballot every two years, unless the municipality has voted to allow or prohibit liquor sales in three such consecutive elections.
Michigan allows any city, village, or township in which there are no retail liquor licenses to prohibit the retail sale of alcoholic liquor within its borders by passage of an ordinance.
Minnesota allows any local jurisdiction to enact laws that are stricter than state liquor law, including completely prohibiting the sale, possession, and consumption of alcoholic beverages.
Mississippi is wet by default; local jurisdictions have to choose to go dry via referendum.
New Hampshire specifically allows local jurisdictions to elect to go dry by public referendum.
New Jersey specifically allows local jurisdictions to exercise control over the sale of alcoholic beverages in retail establishments (liquor stores, restaurants) and to limit or refuse to issue retail licenses.
New Mexico is wet by default, but dry on Sundays until noon. Law does, however, allow for local jurisdictions to elect to go dry by public referendum.
New York specifically allows cities and counties to exercise a local option by public referendum whether to go dry. (see Alcohol laws of New York)
North Carolina allows certain classes of local jurisdictions to exercise a local option by public referendum whether to go dry.
Ohio state law allows local jurisdictions to exercise a local option by public referendum whether to prohibit the sale of liquor.
Rhode Island state law allows local jurisdictions to exercise a local option by public referendum whether to prohibit the sale of liquor.
South Dakota allows certain classes of local jurisdictions to exercise a local option by public referendum whether to prohibit the on-premises sale of liquor.
Tennessee is dry by default; local jurisdictions must choose whether to allow liquor sales in order for liquor to be sold. (see Alcohol laws of Tennessee)
Texas allows local jurisdictions to exercise a local option to decide whether it is "wet" or "dry," and does not limit how that decision shall be made.
Vermont allows municipalities to exercise a local option by public referendum whether to prohibit the sale of liquor.
Virginia allows local jurisdictions to exercise a local option by public referendum whether to prohibit the sale of liquor.
Washington allows local jurisdictions to exercise a local option by public referendum whether to prohibit the sale of liquor.
West Virginia allows local jurisdictions to exercise a local option by public referendum whether to prohibit the sale of liquor.
Wisconsin allows local jurisdictions to exercise a local option by public referendum whether to prohibit the sale of liquor.

States that preclude dry communities

17 states have laws that preclude the existence of any dry counties whatsoever:

Arizona prohibits local jurisdictions from enacting any alcohol laws stricter than state law. As a result, no dry communities can exist in Arizona.
Hawaii does not allow for any local control of liquor beyond licensing of manufacture and sale.
Illinois only allows for local control as to the "number, kind and classification of licenses, for sale at retail of alcoholic liquor," but such local control cannot supersede state law, thereby preventing any local jurisdiction from going dry.
Indiana's comprehensive state alcohol laws only allow local liquor boards to issue liquor licenses for sale and manufacture; all other regulation of alcohol is an operation of state law.
Iowa state law specifically requires each county's liquor board to allow liquor licenses and follow the provisions of state liquor law. As a result, there can be no dry cities or counties in Iowa.
Maryland prohibits local jurisdictions from imposing restrictions on licensing that are stricter than state law.
Missouri state law specifically prohibits any counties, or unincorporated city or town from banning the retail sale of liquor, but only allows incorporated cities to ban the sale of liquor by the drink by public referendum. No incorporated Missouri cities have ever chosen to hold a referendum banning alcohol sales. In addition, Missouri state law specifically supersedes any local laws that restrict the sale of alcohol. (see Alcohol laws of Missouri)
Montana state law vests control of alcoholic beverages solely in the power of the state, although county voters may, by initiative, prohibit alcohol sales. The Crow Indian Reservation and Northern Cheyenne Indian Reservation are fully dry. Since the Reservations are considered federal lands, state laws do not apply. Tribal law bans possession and sale of alcohol completely, even if not tribal members.
Nebraska only grants local governing bodies authority to approve applications and deny licenses pursuant to state law.
Nevada state law specifically requires each county's board of county commissioners to allow liquor licenses and follow the provisions of state liquor law. As a result, there can be no dry cities or counties in Nevada, except that a few rural jurisdictions are grandfathered into the ability to still be partially or totally dry.
North Dakota state law provides that each local jurisdiction's liquor board must allow liquor licenses, and sets the range of allowable fees.
Oklahoma state law requires the liquor ordinances of municipalities and counties to conform to the state Alcoholic Beverage Control Act, and prohibits local jurisdictions from enacting penalties more severe than those of the state law. As a result, there can be no dry cities or counties in Oklahoma. (see Alcohol laws of Oklahoma)
Oregon's Liquor Control Act, which is "designed to operate uniformly throughout the state," specifically replaces and supersedes "any and all municipal charter enactments or local ordinances inconsistent with it," thereby precluding dry communities in Oregon.
Pennsylvania state law vests control of alcoholic beverages solely in the power of the Commonwealth.
South Carolina state law vests control of alcoholic beverages exclusively in the power of the state, although counties are permitted to restrict the hours of operation of locations that sell alcohol.
Utah state law provides that local jurisdictions only may enact alcohol control legislation that does not conflict with state law, thereby precluding the ability of communities to go dry.
Wyoming state law provides that each local jurisdiction's liquor board must allow liquor licenses.

Alabama
Of the 67 counties in Alabama, none are completely dry, 26 are partially dry or "moist" (these counties contain cities that have voted to allow alcohol sales), and 41 are completely wet. In 2014 the municipalities of Oneonta, Blountsville and Cleveland in Blount County went wet, and in 2016 the municipalities of Ashland and Lineville in Clay County went wet. Within those 23 "moist" counties, 41 city governments have legalized alcohol sales inside their city limits.
 In order for an Alabama city or county to hold a wet-dry vote, 25% of the voters in the preceding general election must sign a petition requesting a vote. A city must have a population in excess of 1,000 residents in order to have a referendum to go wet. Petitions can be made to go from dry to wet or wet to dry.

Alaska
 State law allows each village to decide on restrictions, and some boroughs may prohibit it altogether.

Three terms describe Alaskan villages in common usage:

 A "dry village" bans both the sale and possession of alcohol.
 A "wet village" permits both the sale and possession of alcohol.
 A "damp village" permits possession of alcohol but bans the sale of it.

There is wide variation of restrictions placed on the possession and movement of alcohol in the "damp" villages, some villages permit residents to order alcohol from stores outside the ban area and have it shipped in, while other villages require the person owning the alcohol to personally bring the alcohol into their jurisdiction.

Beer, wine and liquor cannot be purchased in grocery stores. Convenience stores and gas stations that sell alcohol must have a separate section with a separate entrance, and separate cash registers.

Arkansas
 Arkansas has 75 counties, 31 of which are dry. Alcohol sales are generally forbidden statewide on Sundays (Packaged liquor, beer and wine sales are currently allowed on Sundays in the cities of Altus, Eureka Springs, Ozark, Springdale and Tontitown, with Rogers and Bentonville added beginning January 1, 2023; additionally, licensed microbreweries can sell growlers for carry-out on Sundays) and on Christmas Day. (Amendment 100 to the Arkansas Constitution allows alcohol to be served in the casino properties every day of the year including Sunday and Christmas.) The issue is more complex than that, however, since any local jurisdiction (county, municipal, etc.) can exercise control over alcohol laws via public referendum. For this reason, some cities like Jacksonville, are dry despite being located in a "wet" county. In Fort Smith the same situation exists but with a wet city existing in an otherwise dry county. A city or municipality can elect to go dry in a wet county, but a city or municipality cannot elect to go wet in a dry county. Occasionally, in counties with two county seats, one district may be wet and the other dry, such as Sebastian and Logan Counties.
 Dry counties (with county seat(s) in parentheses): Ashley (Hamburg), Bradley (Warren), Clay (Corning/Piggott), Cleburne (Heber Springs), Craighead (Jonesboro/Lake City), Crawford (Van Buren), Faulkner (Conway), Fulton (Salem), Grant (Sheridan), Hempstead (Hope), Howard (Nashville), Independence (Batesville), Izard (Melbourne), Johnson (Clarksville), Lafayette (Lewisville), Lawrence (Walnut Ridge/Powhatan), Lincoln (Star City), Southern Logan (Booneville), Lonoke (Lonoke), Montgomery (Mt. Ida), Nevada (Prescott), Newton (Jasper), Perry (Perryville), Pike (Murfreesboro), Polk (Mena), Pope (Russellville), Scott (Waldron), Searcy (Marshall), Southern Sebastian (Greenwood), Stone (Mountain View), White (Searcy), and Yell (Dardanelle/Danville).
 Wet counties (with county seat(s) in parentheses): Arkansas (De Witt/Stuttgart), Baxter (Mountain Home), Benton (Bentonville), Boone (Harrison), Calhoun, (Hampton), Carroll (Berryville/Eureka Springs), Chicot (Lake Village), Clark (Arkadelphia), Cleveland (Rison), Columbia (Magnolia), Conway (Morrilton), Crittenden (Marion), Cross (Wynne), Desha (Arkansas City), Dallas (Fordyce), Drew (Monticello), Franklin (Ozark/Charleston), Garland (Hot Springs), Greene (Paragould), Hot Spring (Malvern), Jackson (Newport), Jefferson (Pine Bluff), Lee (Marianna), Little River (Ashdown), Northern Logan (Paris), Madison (Huntsville), Marion (Yellville), Miller (Texarkana), Mississippi (Osceola/Blytheville), Monroe (Clarendon), Ouachita (Camden), Phillips (Helena), Poinsett (Harrisburg), Prairie (Des Arc/De Valls Bluff), Pulaski (Little Rock), Randolph (Pocahontas), Saline (Benton), St. Francis (Forrest City), Northern Sebastian (Fort Smith), Sevier (De Queen), Sharp (Ash Flat) Union (El Dorado), Van Buren (Clinton), Washington (Fayetteville), and Woodruff (Augusta).

Connecticut
 There is no legally dry community in Connecticut. Bridgewater was the last remaining dry town in the state; voters approved the sale of alcohol in a 2014 referendum by a 660–246 vote.

Florida
There are two dry counties in Florida: Lafayette County in North Central Florida and Liberty in the Florida Panhandle.

Before 2012, Madison County was partially dry; it only allowed beer sales if the beer's alcohol content was under 6.243 percent. Madison County voters repealed that law in 2012. Suwannee County was formerly dry, but county voters chose to go "wet" by a 2–1 margin in a 2011 vote.

Until the 1950s Leon County and Wakulla County were dry. The closest spot alcohol could be legally purchased was Perry, in Taylor County.

Various Florida counties and cities are wet, but have blue laws regulating alcohol sales on Sunday morning.

Georgia
All Georgia counties are fully wet, with the exception of the following:
Bleckley County prohibits the sale of distilled spirits for retail and on-site consumption.
 Butts County prohibits the sale of distilled spirits for on-site consumption.
 Coweta County prohibits the retail sale of distilled spirits.
 Decatur County prohibits the sale of distilled spirits for on-site consumption.
 Dodge County prohibits the retail sale of distilled spirits.
 Effingham County prohibits the retail sale of distilled spirits.
 Hart County prohibits the sale of distilled spirits for retail and on-site consumption.
 Lumpkin County prohibits the retail sale of distilled spirits.
 Murray County prohibits the sale of distilled spirits for retail and on-site consumption.
 Union County prohibits the retail sale of distilled spirits.
 Upson County prohibits the retail sale of distilled spirits. The sale of distilled spirits for on-site consumption was approved by vote in May 2014.
 White County prohibits the sale of distilled spirits for retail and on-site consumption (except for the City of Helen).

Illinois
 Edwards County is a dry county, with multiple referendums to allow alcohol sales failing in the mid-1990s. The portion of Grayville that lies within Edwards County does allow alcohol sales per Grayville city ordinance.
 Moweaqua, located in Shelby County, and founded in 1854, was a dry town since origination until March 2014.
 Stewardson, also located in Shelby County, was a dry town from 1910 until 2014, when voters approved alcohol sales.
 The village of South Holland has been a dry municipality since it was founded by Dutch Reformed immigrants in 1894. In accordance with the state liquor law (see overview), South Holland bans the sale of alcohol by not issuing licenses for any business to sell alcohol in the community. The possession, consumption and transport of alcohol are all permitted in South Holland. Other villages in Illinois' Cook County, such as Oak Park and Evanston, were once dry communities, but have since re-allowed the sale of alcohol, though these villages still tend to have tougher regulation on alcohol sales than the rest of the county.
 South Ottawa Township, LaSalle County within Ottawa elected to stay dry after the end of Prohibition; it remained a dry township until this was overturned by a unanimous city council vote in October 2013.
 Wheaton, which has a large evangelical Christian population, prohibited the sale of alcoholic beverages from 1887 until 1985.

Kansas

Kansas prohibited alcohol from 1881 to 1948, and continued to prohibit bars selling liquor by the drink until 1987. Both the 1948 amendment to the Kansas Constitution that ended prohibition and the 1986 amendment that allowed for open saloons provided that the amendments only would be in effect in counties that had approved the respective amendments, either during the election over the amendment itself or subsequently.

All 105 counties in Kansas have approved the 1948 amendment, but three counties (Wallace, Stanton, and Haskell) have never approved the 1986 amendment, and therefore continue to prohibit any and all sale of liquor by the drink. Public bars (so-called "open saloons") are illegal in these dry counties. Another 63 counties approved the 1986 amendment, but with a requirement that to sell liquor by the drink, an establishment must receive 30% of its gross revenues from food sales. 39 counties in Kansas have fully approved the 1986 amendment without any limitation, allowing liquor to be sold by the drink without any food sales requirement.

Kentucky

(As of February 2020)  Of the 120 counties in Kentucky, 11 counties are dry, 53 are wet, and the remaining 56 are either "moist" or dry with special circumstances.

Maine
Maine was the first dry state in the country. As of 2019, 37 towns in Maine remained dry.

Massachusetts

As of 2013, there were only eight completely dry towns in Massachusetts: Alford, Chilmark, Dunstable, Gosnold, Hawley, Montgomery, Mount Washington, and Westhampton. The number of dry towns has decreased over time: according to the Massachusetts Alcoholic Beverage Control Commission, there were 20 dry towns in Massachusetts in 2000.

Tisbury is a formerly dry town that became partially wet after voters passed a motion at the Tisbury town election on April 27, 2012. Alcoholic beverages may only be served to patrons who are consuming a full meal. Rockport, after being dry since 1856, allowed alcohol sales in restaurants in 2006 and in stores in 2019.

Michigan
 Hudsonville voted to allow alcohol sales on November 6, 2007, ending its run as the last dry city in Michigan. Hudsonville's vote follows the precedent of voters in both Zeeland, and Allendale Charter Township, choosing to overturn their bans on alcohol sales to adults age 21 and older in recent years.
 Oak Park had been dry since its establishment in 1945. A vote on July 15, 2013, allows up to 20 restaurants to obtain tavern licenses, but they could not sell spirits or mixed drinks. On May 5, 2015 the citizens of Oak Park voted to allow mixed drinks to be sold at businesses within city limits in addition to beer and wine, which were previously allowed.

Minnesota

 Lakeside, a neighborhood within Duluth, prohibited the sale of alcohol even though it is part of a larger municipality. This was part of its charter when it was incorporated into Duluth in 1893. An advisory referendum to overturn the prohibition failed by one vote (2858 to 2857) in November 2008. A later referendum passed, and the ban was repealed by the City Council on June 27, 2016.
 A law was passed permitting the sale of liquor in liquor stores (off-sale) on Sundays in Minnesota starting July 2, 2017. Minnesota no longer prohibits the sale of liquor in liquor stores (off-sale) on Sundays. Bars and restaurants may also sell liquor on Sundays for on-premises consumption. 3.2% alcohol beer is also allowed for sale on Sundays in convenience and grocery stores.
 No alcohol is sold on the Red Lake Indian Reservation.

Mississippi

As of January 1, 2021, all counties are "wet" by default and allow for the sale of beer and light wine unless they vote to become dry again through a future referendum.

Nevada
 The town of Panaca, Nevada, was southern Nevada's first permanent settlement, founded as a Mormon colony in 1864. It originally was part of Washington County, Utah, but the Congressional redrawing of boundaries in 1866 shifted Panaca into Nevada. It remains Nevada's only dry municipality, only because it is grandfathered into state law.

New Hampshire
According to the New Hampshire Liquor Commission, Ellsworth is the only town to disallow the sale of alcoholic beverages. (Other towns allow sales of alcohol, but with restrictions). The most recent town to go "wet" is Sharon; the town voted to repeal its dry law in 2014.

New Jersey

New Jersey has no dry counties, but as of 2017, at least 30 municipalities (out of 565 statewide) prohibit the retail sale of alcohol. Most of the dry towns are in South Jersey, and some of them are dry because of their origins as Quaker, Methodist, or other Protestant religious communities. Dry towns in New Jersey cannot forbid the possession, consumption, or transportation of alcohol, but have the option to permit or prohibit BYOB at restaurants and social affair permits for non-profit organizations. It is possible for a dry town to have a winery or brewery that offers tastings, since alcohol manufacturing licenses in New Jersey are issued by the state, and are not regulated by municipalities.

 Audubon Park in Camden County
 Cape May Point in Cape May County
 Collingswood in Camden County
 Delanco Township in Burlington County
 Downe Township in Cumberland County
 Elk Township in Gloucester County
 Elmer in Salem County
 Far Hills in Somerset County
 Haddonfield in Camden County
 Haddon Heights in Camden County
 Interlaken in Monmouth County
 Island Heights in Ocean County
 Lawrence Township in Cumberland County
 Lower Alloways Creek Township in Salem County
 Mannington Township in Salem County
 Mantoloking in Ocean County
 Maurice River Township in Cumberland County
 Ocean City in Cape May County
 Ocean Grove in Monmouth County
 Oldmans Township in Salem County
 Pemberton in Burlington County
 Pennington in Mercer County
 Pitman in Gloucester County
 Port Republic in Atlantic County
 Prospect Park in Passaic County
 Quinton Township in Salem County
 Riverton in Burlington County
 Saddle River in Bergen County
 Shiloh in Cumberland County
 South Harrison Township in Gloucester County
 Stow Creek Township in Cumberland County
 Upper Deerfield Township in Cumberland County
 Upper Pittsgrove Township in Salem County
 Wenonah in Gloucester County
 Wildwood Crest in Cape May County

New Mexico
Curry County is dry except for the city of Clovis
Roosevelt County is dry except for the city of Portales

New York
 As of the 2019 election, there are eight towns in New York state that are completely dry, and 39 that are partially dry.
 The "dry" towns in the state are: Caneadea in Allegany County, Clymer in Chautauqua County, Lapeer in Cortland County, Orwell in Oswego County, Fremont and Jasper in Steuben County, Berkshire in Tioga County.
 The town of West Almond does not allow off-premises consumption, while the towns of Harford, Franklin, Seneca, Caton, Rathbone, Newark Valley, Butler, Rose, Pike, Wethersfield and Middlesex do not allow on-premises consumption.
 The towns of Bovina, Gorham, Richford, Orangeville, and Barrington do not allow on-premises consumption except in year-round hotels.
 The other 22 partially dry towns have varying specific rules for "Special On-Premises Consumption." For example, Wilmington in Essex County is dry for on-premises consumption at race tracks and outdoor athletic fields and stadiums where admission fees are charged and wet in all other areas.

North Carolina
 North Carolina does not allow alcohol sales between 2am and 7am Monday through Saturday or before 12pm on Sundays. In June 2017, NC allowed each municipality or county (for unincorporated areas) to start allowing alcohol sales prior to noon on Sundays. Raleigh and Carrboro were the first two cities to enact the 10am Sunday alcohol sales. 
 Several of North Carolina's 100 counties are considered "dry". Individual towns may pass ordinances (via referendum) that may allow alcohol sales within the municipal limits, however, even if the county itself is dry. Most counties, such as Wake and Mecklenburg, allow alcohol sales of any type anywhere in the county, eliminating the potential need for any town or city within its boundary to do so.
 Town and city ordinances concerning alcohol sales may be more liberal than the county's, but may not be more restrictive.
 The only county where alcohol sales were not permitted at all (even in a town) was Graham County but this is no longer the case, as the towns of Fontana Dam and Robbinsville now allow beer and wine sales.

Ohio

 The city of Westerville, Ohio, was dry for more than a century. Once the home of the Anti-Saloon League and called the "dry capital of the world", the first legal drink in recent times was served in 2006.
 The village of Bethel in Clermont County has been dry since the repeal of prohibition. Recently, through use of the single precinct vote system, precincts A and C can now sell (but not serve) alcohol. The business must first be put onto the ballot and voted to allow alcohol to be sold.
 Cortland was a dry town until 2002.
 Lawrence County is dry but individual towns can choose to allow sales of alcohol.
 Hartville, was a dry village, but is no longer dry as of 2013.
 Albany is a dry town.
 Adams County besides Manchester and Green Township are dry. Recently, through use of the single precinct vote system, a precinct in Seaman and Peebles can now sell (but not serve) alcohol.
 Although Scioto County and Portsmouth are not completely dry; Green Township, including Franklin Furnace, are dry.

Oklahoma

Until 2018, several counties in Oklahoma were dry counties. These included Adair, Alfalfa, Beaver, Caddo, Cimarron, Coal, Cotton, Dewey, Harmon, Harper, Haskell, Hughes, Roger Mills and Washita. After State Question 792 was passed, these counties have since allowed the sale of alcohol.

As of June 2018, all 77 counties allow liquor by the drink.

Oregon
 The city of Monmouth was the last dry municipality in the state until it repealed its prohibition on January 10, 2003. Oregon state law now prohibits any dry community from existing (see below).
 Throughout the state, beer, wine, wine coolers, malt liquor and similar beverages may be purchased in a convenience store, grocery store and similar outlets. Sales of "hard" liquor are restricted to state-controlled outlets, however, as well as bars, or restaurants that include a bar. As such, there are relatively few stand-alone liquor stores in Oregon (for example, as of March 18, 2008, there were only 35 stand-alone liquor stores in the city of Portland, which had a 2000 population of 529,000). Oregon also has taverns that sell beer and wine only. All outlets selling "hard" liquor are subject to the rules and regulations of the state-run Oregon Liquor Control Commission (OLCC). By law, any establishment wishing to sell any alcoholic beverage in the state must also offer food for sale, including bars, taverns, music venues, fairs and festivals, and strip clubs. Oregon is one of 18 states that directly control the sales of alcohol beverages in the U.S.

Pennsylvania

 The state has a number of dry municipalities, but no dry counties.
 In Pennsylvania, sales of alcoholic beverages were prohibited in convenience stores until 2017. 
 Beer, wine and spirits are available for on-premises consumption at bars, taverns and restaurants; no single bottles or cans can be sold to drink off-premises.
 Unopened six- and twelve-packs of beer, and single units of certain larger sizes (i.e., 22- and 40-ounce bottles) can be sold "to-go" by bars, taverns, and certain restaurants. Though convenience and grocery stores broadly cannot sell beer or malt liquor, some have created attached "cafe" areas that, though enclosed by the store, are legally separate, allowing them to sell beer.
 Bars, taverns, etc., can only sell a limited quantity of beer in a single transaction. Cases and kegs of beer are sold only by state-licensed independent beer distributors.
 Spirits are only available in state owned/operated liquor stores. See the Pennsylvania Liquor Control Board.
 Bottles of wine are available in state owned/operated liquor stores, as well as certain grocery stores. 
 Independent producers may be exempt in certain ways

South Carolina
 South Carolina does not allow the retail sale of alcohol for off-premises consumption on Sundays. Counties and cities can permit beer and wine sales, however, if the citizens vote for them in a referendum. Twelve counties currently allow Sunday beer and wine sales: Anderson, Richland, Georgetown, Charleston, Beaufort, Greenville, Horry, Berkeley, Dorchester, Newberry, Pickens County Kershaw, Lancaster, and York. Sumter County voted for and passed beer and wine sales on Sundays in November 2020. Cities and towns that have passed laws allowing Sunday beer and wine sales include Anderson, Columbia, Lexington, Spartanburg, Greenville, Travelers Rest, Mauldin, Aiken, Rock Hill, Summerville, Santee, Daniel Island, Tega Cay, Hardeeville, Winnsboro, and Walterboro.

South Dakota
 Oglala Lakota County (which is located entirely within the Pine Ridge Indian Reservation) is a dry county.

Tennessee

 The consolidated city-county government of Lynchburg and Moore County, Tennessee, is a dry county, despite being home to the Jack Daniel's distillery.

While Moore County itself had been completely dry, the County now allows the sale of commemorative bottles of Jack in the White Rabbit Bottle Shop, and one can take part in a sampling tour at the distillery. It is also now possible to sample wine, rum, vodka and whiskey in shops where it is distilled on premises, and beer is also available in local food establishments when served with a meal.

 Blount, Crockett, Hancock, Sevier, Stewart, and Weakley are also dry counties. Several municipalities within Blount County are wet.
 Some municipalities and counties allow sales of liquor-by-the-drink and retail package stores.

Texas
Of Texas' 254 counties, 5 are completely dry, 196 are partially dry, and 55 are entirely wet. The vast majority of entirely wet counties are in southern border regions of Texas near Mexico, or in the south central portion.

Alcohol law in Texas varies significantly by location. In some counties, 4% beer is legal. In others, beverages that are 14% or less alcohol are legal. In some "dry" areas, a customer can get a mixed drink by paying to join a "private club," and in some "wet" areas a customer needs a club membership to purchase liquor by-the-drink. "...Move to Burleson, which has alcohol sales in the Tarrant County portion of the city but not in the Johnson County side of town." Today beer and wine can be purchased in all parts of Burleson. The only places in the county where liquor can be purchased are a couple of stores inside the city limits of Alvarado and Rio Vista.

A bill passed in 2003 by the Texas Legislature allows for Justice of the Peace precincts to host alcohol option elections. To date, this law has allowed many JP precincts, particularly in East Texas, to allow a vote that has resulted in many previously dry counties becoming "moist" and allowing sales of beer and wine, but not liquor.

Texas law prohibits off-premises sale of liquor (but not beer and wine) all day on Sunday, Thanksgiving Day, Christmas Day, and New Year's Day. Off-premises sale of beer and wine on Sunday is only allowed from 10:01 am onward.

Texas law also prohibits the sale of alcohol in any "sexually oriented business" in a dry county. Strip clubs in these dry counties often sell "set ups" (a cup with soda, ice, and a stirrer to which one can add their own alcohol) and have a BYOB policy to allow patrons to bring their own alcohol into the establishment.

Utah
As of September 2018 there are 9 cities where alcoholic beverages cannot be purchased.
 Aneth, San Juan County. Possession, manufacture, or delivery of alcoholic beverages prohibited.
 Aurora, Sevier County
 Blanding, San Juan County. Sale of alcoholic beverages prohibited since 1967.
 Hatch, Garfield County
 Highland, Utah County
 Holden, Millard County
 Navajo Mountain, San Juan County Possession, manufacture, or delivery of alcoholic beverages prohibited.
 Scipio, Millard County
 White Mesa, San Juan County

Virginia
Beer and wine sales are legal in all of Virginia. Of the 95 counties in Virginia, nine (Bland, Buchanan, Charlotte, Craig, Grayson, Highland, Lee, Patrick and Russell) are dry in that retail sale of distilled spirits is prohibited. Virginia cities are not subject to county alcohol laws as they are independent by state law, and all Virginia cities are wet. Virginia also restricts the sale of hard liquors (or distilled spirits) to retail stores operated by the Virginia Alcoholic Beverage Control Authority. This setup is unusual in that the state agency is not only responsible for the sale of liquor, but also for the enforcement of alcohol-related laws in addition to public education campaigns. These campaigns are generally geared toward young adults not of drinking age, but also cover topics such as substance abuse, training for hospitality industry employees, and cautioning of the dangers of mixing alcohol and medications.

Washington
 The city of Fircrest was the last dry community on the west coast of the contiguous 48 states. Voters chose to allow the sale of alcohol by the glass in Fircrest in the 3 November 2015 election. 
 The Yakama Nation prohibits the sale of alcohol on the Yakama Indian Reservation.
 The city of College Place allows sale of alcohol in stores, but has no taverns or cocktail lounges.

Wisconsin

 The village of Ephraim was once the only dry municipality in Wisconsin; it had been dry since its founding in 1853, and its anti-liquor laws were upheld in 1934 and 1992 referendums. Richland Center and Port Edwards were dry for decades, but bars opened in both communities in 1994 after changes to local ordinances. Ephraim passed an ordinance to allow off-site beer and on-site wine sales on April 5, 2016.
 The city of Sparta is the largest community in Wisconsin that restricts beer and liquor sales to taverns and restaurants that have an on-premises consumption license. Grocery and convenience stores cannot sell beer and liquor there. The community abolished Class A licenses for retail sales in 1966 through referendum, when a local liquor store owner in the city objected to a grocery store's application for a class A license. Referendums were defeated in 1982, 1986, 1992, 2005, 2007, 2009, and 2011 for class A licenses. Opposition to Class A licenses in the community is widely believed to be from the liquor store owner(s), who locate on the border of the city in neighboring towns that allow Class A licenses. Local opposition from these liquor stores is also widely believed to be a monopolistic motivation to protect their business trade by restricting it in Sparta. On April 7, 2009, in the Wisconsin 2009 spring general election, voters defeated the referendum questions about changing restrictions on the beer and liquor sales in Sparta, for the sixth time. In the April 5, 2011 Wisconsin spring election, Sparta voted for the seventh time not to change restrictions on the sale of beer and liquor in the city. In the April 1, 2014 Wisconsin spring election, the voters narrowly approved the sale of wine and beer in groceries and convenience stores. Liquor sales remain banned in the city.

References

External links
 Frequently Asked Questions on Minnesota liquor laws

Dry
Prohibition in the United States
Dry Communities